Karl Tage Herbert Adolfsson (16 July 1906 – 7 November 1979) was a Swedish athlete. He competed in the men's high jump at the 1928 Summer Olympics.

References

External links
 

1906 births
1979 deaths
Athletes (track and field) at the 1928 Summer Olympics
Swedish male high jumpers
Olympic athletes of Sweden
People from Hultsfred Municipality
Sportspeople from Kalmar County
20th-century Swedish people